Joseph Dervaes (27 October 1906 – 12 April 1986) was a Belgian racing cyclist. He won the Belgian national road race title in 1928 and the Tour of Flanders in 1929.

References

External links

1906 births
1986 deaths
Belgian male cyclists
People from Wetteren
Cyclists from East Flanders